The Fresh Breeze Respect is a family of German paramotors that was designed and produced by Fresh Breeze of Wedemark for powered paragliding. Now out of production, when it was available the aircraft was supplied complete and ready-to-fly.

Design and development
The Respect was designed to comply with the US FAR 103 Ultralight Vehicles rules as well as European regulations. It features a paraglider-style wing, single-place accommodation and a single  Solo 210 or  Hirth F33 engine, depending on the model in pusher configuration with a reduction drive and a  diameter two-bladed composite propeller. The aircraft propeller cage can be folded into four parts and the aircraft rigged with low or high hang points.

As is the case with all paramotors, take-off and landing is accomplished by foot. Inflight steering is accomplished via handles that actuate the canopy brakes, creating roll and yaw.

Variants
Respect 122
Model with a  Solo 210 engine with a 2.57:1 ratio reduction drive and a  diameter two-bladed composite propeller.
Respect Monster
Model with a  Hirth F33 engine with a 2.65:1 ratio reduction drive and a  diameter two-bladed composite propeller.

Specifications (Respect Monster)

References

Respect
2000s German ultralight aircraft
Single-engined pusher aircraft
Paramotors